Kents Cavern is a cave system in Torquay, Devon, England. It is notable both for its archaeological and geological features (as a karst feature in the Devonian limestone). The cave system is open to the public and has been a geological Site of Special Scientific Interest since 1952 and a Scheduled Ancient Monument since 1957.

Prehistory
The caverns and passages were formed in the early Pleistocene period in Devonian limestone by water action, and have been occupied by one of at least eight separate, discontinuous native populations to have inhabited the British Isles. The other key paleolithic sites in the UK are Happisburgh, Pakefield, Boxgrove, Swanscombe, Pontnewydd, Paviland, Creswell Crags and Gough's Cave.

Kents Cavern 4

A prehistoric upper jawbone (maxilla) fragment was discovered in the cavern during a 1927 excavation by the Torquay Natural History Society, and named Kents Cavern 4. The specimen is on display at the Torquay Museum.

In 1989 the fragment was radiocarbon dated to 36,400–34,700 years BP, but a 2011 study that dated fossils from neighbouring strata produced an estimate of 44,200–41,500 years BP. The same study analysed the dental structure of the fragment and determined it to be Homo sapiens rather than Homo neanderthalensis, which would have made it the earliest anatomically modern human fossil yet discovered in northwestern Europe. In a response to this paper in 2012 the authors Mark White and Paul Pettitt wrote "We urge caution over using a small selected sample of fauna
from an old and poorly executed excavation in Kent's Cavern to provide a radiocarbon stratigraphy and age for a human fossil that cannot be dated directly, and we suggest that the recent dating should be rejected."

Modern history

As an archæological site

Kents Cavern is first recorded as Kents Hole Close on a 1659 deed when the land was leased to John Black. The earliest evidence of exploration of the caves in historic times is two inscriptions, "William Petre 1571" and "Robert Hedges 1688" engraved on stalagmites. The first recorded excavation was that of Thomas Northmore in 1824. Northmore's work attracted the attention of William Buckland, the first Reader in Geology at the University of Oxford, who sent a party including John MacEnery to explore the caves in an attempt to find evidence that Mithras was once worshipped in the area. MacEnery, the Roman Catholic chaplain at Torre Abbey, conducted systematic excavations between 1824 and 1829. When MacEnery reported to the British Association the discovery of flint tools below the stalagmites on the cave floor, his work was derided as contrary to Bishop James Ussher's Biblical chronology dating the Creation to 4004 BC.

In September 1845 the recently created Torquay Natural History Society requested permission from Sir Lawrence Palk to explore the caves to obtain fossils and artefacts for the planned Torquay Museum, and as a result Edward Vivian and William Pengelly were allowed to conduct excavations between 1846 and 1858. Vivian reported to the Geological Society in 1847, but at the time, it was generally believed that early humans had entered the caves long after the formation of the cave structures examined. This changed when in the Autumn of 1859, following the work of Pengelly at the Brixham Cavern and of Jacques de Perthes in France, the Royal Society, the Society of Antiquaries, and the British Association agreed that the excavations had established the antiquity of humanity.
In 1865 the British Association created a committee, led by Pengelly, to fully explore the cave system over the course of fifteen years. It was Pengelly's party that discovered Robert Hedges' stalagmite inscription, and from the stalagmite's growth since that time deduced that human-created artefacts found under the formation could be half a million years old. Pengelly plotted the position of every bone, flint, and other artefact he discovered during the excavations, and afterward continued working with the Torquay Natural History Society until his death in 1892 at his home less than 2 km from the caves.

The olm (Proteus anguinus), an aquatic salamander native to Italy and Slovenia, was introduced to Kent's Cavern in the 1940s.

As a tourist attraction

In 1903 Kents Cavern, then part of Lord Haldon's estate, was sold to Francis Powe, a carpenter who originally used the caves as a workshop while making beach huts for the Torquay sea front. Powe's son, Leslie Powe, turned the caves into a tourist attraction by laying concrete paths, installing electric lighting, and building visitor facilities that later were improved, in turn, by his son John Powe. The caves, now owned by Nick Powe, celebrated 100 years of Powe family ownership on 23 August 2003 with special events including an archæological dig for children and a display by a cave rescue team. A year later a new £500,000 visitor centre was opened, including a restaurant and gift shop.

Attracting 80,000 tourists a year, Kents Cavern is an important tourist attraction and this was recognised in 2000 when it was awarded Showcave of the Year award and later in November 2005 when it was awarded a prize for being Torquay's Visitor Attraction of the year.

Kents Cavern is one of the most important geosites in the English Riviera Geopark, one of over 170 UNESCO Global Geoparks.

Kents Cavern in fiction
"Hampsley Cavern" in Agatha Christie's 1924 novel The Man in the Brown Suit, is based on Kents Cavern. The 2011 science fiction romance Time Watchers: The Greatest of These, by Julie Reilly, uses Kents Cavern as a principal setting in three different time periods.

See also

 Boxgrove
 Gough's Cave
 Genetic history of the British Isles
 Happisburgh
 List of human evolution fossils
 List of prehistoric structures in Great Britain
 Pakefield
 Prehistoric Britain
 Paviland
 Pontnewydd
 Swanscombe

References

External links
 

 Kents Cavern homepage
 Geochronology of Kents Cavern

Archaeological sites in Devon
Caves of Devon
Geology of Devon
Scheduled monuments in Devon
Show caves in the United Kingdom
Sites of Special Scientific Interest in Devon
Stone Age sites in England
Torquay
Paleoanthropological sites